The 2010 North–South Expressway crash took place on 10 October 2010. Twelve people were killed and more than 50 others injured in a highway crash involving two buses, three cars and a van at Km 223 of the North–South Expressway, near the Simpang Ampat Interchange, Malacca, Malaysia. The accident caused massive traffic jams on both sides of the expressway.

References

See also 
 List of road accidents

Road incidents in Malaysia
North–South Expressway Crash, 2010
North–South Expressway Crash, 2010